The 2021 Atlanta Open (also known as the Truist Atlanta Open for sponsorship reasons) is a professional tennis tournament to be played on hard courts. It is the 33rd edition of the tournament, and part of the 2021 ATP Tour. It take place at Atlantic Station in Atlanta, United States between July 24 and August 1, 2021. The tournament is hosted in the same week as the 2020 Summer Olympics.

Champions

Singles 

 John Isner def.  Brandon Nakashima 7–6(10–8), 7–5
It was Isner's 6th title in Atlanta and 16th title overall.

Doubles 

 Reilly Opelka /  Jannik Sinner def.  Steve Johnson /  Jordan Thompson 6–4, 6–7(6–8), [10–3].

Points and prize money

Point distribution

Prize money 

*per team

Singles main-draw entrants

Seeds

 1 Rankings are as of July 19, 2021.

Other entrants
The following players received wildcards into the main draw:
  Trent Bryde
  Milos Raonic
  Jack Sock

The following player received entry using a protected ranking:
  J. J. Wolf

The following player received entry as special exempt:
  Brandon Nakashima

The following players received entry from the qualifying draw:
  Evgeny Donskoy
  Bjorn Fratangelo
  Peter Gojowczyk
  Christopher O'Connell

Withdrawals 
Before the tournament
  Grigor Dimitrov → replaced by  Yasutaka Uchiyama
  Egor Gerasimov → replaced by  Mackenzie McDonald
  Sebastian Korda → replaced by  Denis Kudla
  Adrian Mannarino → replaced by  Ričardas Berankis
  Tommy Paul → replaced by  Andreas Seppi
  Guido Pella → replaced by  Kevin Anderson

Doubles main-draw entrants

Seeds

1 Rankings are as of July 19, 2021.

Other entrants
The following pairs received wildcards into the doubles main draw:
  Keshav Chopra /  Andres Martin
  Nick Kyrgios /  Jack Sock

References

External links 
 

Atlanta Open
2021
Atlanta Open
Atlanta Open
Atlanta Open
Atlanta Open
Atlanta Open